"Angeleyes" (also known as "Angel Eyes") is a pop song written and recorded in 1978 by the Swedish group ABBA, and is featured on their sixth studio album, Voulez-Vous. Released as a double A-side with the title track of the album in July 1979, the lyrics and music were composed by Benny Andersson and Björn Ulvaeus. As one of ABBA's most popular tracks in the United Kingdom, the song was a successful hit, peaking at No. 3 on the singles chart.

History
"Angeleyes" (which had the working title "Katakusom") is a song in which the protagonist beseeches women to avoid the deceptively innocent looking gaze of a handsome yet deceitful man, warning them to beware of the "game he likes to play." The vocals came from Ulvaeus, Agnetha Fältskog and Anni-Frid Lyngstad.

Reception and reviews
In the United Kingdom, "Angeleyes" was released as a double A-side with "Voulez-Vous", this being an unusual move for the group. ABBA and the personnel at Epic, the group's British record label, believed that with its classic ABBA arrangement, "Angeleyes" would be considerably popular with the record buying public. No promotional video for "Angeleyes" was made; as ABBA had filmed one for "Voulez-Vous", this was used to promote the double A-side single on "Top of the Pops". The double A-side peaked at No. 3 in the UK in August 1979.

As of September 2021, the double side is ABBA's 13th most popular song in the UK, including both pure sales and digital streams.

Coincidentally, ABBA's "Angeleyes" was in the UK Top 20 at the same time as another unrelated song called "Angel Eyes" by the British rock group Roxy Music. The latter track was composed by musicians Bryan Ferry and Andy Mackay, and although the two songs possess some lyrical similarities, Ferry and Mackay's song is more reminiscent of contemporary pop rock.

In critical terms, when the track was featured on the popular TV series Juke Box Jury, the panel (which featured Alan Freeman, Johnny Rotten, Joan Collins and Elaine Paige) voted the song a "miss", wrongly predicting that it would not be a hit for the group. Oddly enough, only "Angeleyes" was mentioned on the show, with no reference made to "Voulez-Vous". A retrospective review of the Voulez-Vous album by AllMusic critic Bruce Eder gave "Angeleyes" a citation as an 'Album Pick' while praising the work as a whole.

In the United States, the individual "Angeleyes" single failed to climb that high in the charts, reaching No. 64 on the Billboard Hot 100 in October 1979. "Voulez-Vous" fared even worse a month before, peaking at No. 80. Compared to expectations, the songs' parent album only performed modestly in the US.  Cash Box said the song had "bubbly female harmonies and a layered, string-driven melody showing an inviting pop-classical influence."

In October 1979 (three months after the single release), "Angeleyes" was included on the group's compilation album Greatest Hits Vol. 2. It was not featured on ABBA's 1982 double-album compilation The Singles: The First Ten Years.

"Angeleyes" has also been a part of numerous other ABBA compilations over the years, including More ABBA Gold: More ABBA Hits (1993); the four-CD box-set Thank You for the Music (1994); The Definitive Collection (2001), and The Albums (2008).

In 2022, "Angeleyes" became a popular song on the TikTok social media platform. Mashable noted: "TikTokkers have been using the sound, a sped-up version of 'Angeleyes' by ABBA, to reminisce about the things they used to love, from television shows to discontinued candies." ABBA's own TikTok account participated in the trend, posting a video of Björn Ulvaeus and his platform boots set to the song.

Charts

Certifications

Mamma Mia! Here We Go Again version
"Angel Eyes" was released on 13 July 2018, alongside the soundtrack of Mamma Mia! Here We Go Again, by Capitol and Polydor Records. The song is performed by Julie Walters (Rosie), Christine Baranski (Tanya) and Amanda Seyfried (Sophie) and it was produced by Benny Andersson.

Charts

Certifications

References

1979 singles
ABBA songs
Songs written by Benny Andersson and Björn Ulvaeus
Epic Records singles
1979 songs
Disco songs